Gaindatherium is an extinct genus of rhinoceros that lived in Asia during the Miocene. It is mainly known from the Siwalik Hills in Pakistan, though its fossils have been found as far west as the Negev desert.

Description
Gaindatherium is believed to be the direct ancestor of the genus Rhinoceros. Among the features it shares with that genus are arched nasal bones that helped support its single horn and a forward-inclined back of skull. Its skull is longer and narrower compared to Rhinoceros, with more primitive brachyodont teeth.

References

Miocene mammals of Asia
Miocene rhinoceroses